HMS Triton was a modified  sixth-rate 28-gun frigate of the Royal Navy.

History
She was built at Buckler's Hard on the Hampshire coast 1772/73. She was then moved to Portsmouth Dockyard for full fitting out as a Royal Navy vessel, a process taking two years.

She was first commissioned in August 1775 under Captain Skeffington Lutwidge, prior to her completion (fitting out) in November 1775. Only in March 1776 did she make her first trans-Atlantic voyage initially to North America and from 1777 stationed in the St Lawrence River where she remained for two years. During this period she captured the privateer "Pompey" on 13 Jne 1778

From February to April 1779 she was fitted with a copper bottom at Chatham Docks. She was fitted with six extra heavy guns in August. Returning to America she captured the American privateer "Gates" in September 1779.

On 8 January 1780 she was part of the attack on the Caracas Convoy off the coast of Spain, where around two dozen Royal Navy vessels attacked around a dozen Spanish merchant ships. Several ships were captured and recommissioned as Royal Navy ships including HMS St Fermin. Eight days later she was in the Battle of Cape St Vincent. A month later she had a further upgrade of guns.

She spent some time in the Leeward Islands and in December 1780 command passed briefly to Captain Andrew Sutherland before passing to Captain John McLaurin who took the ship to Tobago and on 12 April 1782 took part in the huge Battle of the Saintes against the French fleet which was amajor British victory. Afterwards she was berthed at St Kitts. Presumably damaged from the battle she was paid off in November and returned to England for "major repairs' at Limehouse Docks in London which took five months.

In December 1787 Captain Valentine Edwards took command and had an uneventful three years with the ship. She was recommissioned in June 1790 and refitted at Deptford. She then sailed for Jamaica under Captain George Murray.

In April 1794 Captain Scory Barker took command and took her on one final trip to Jamaica. She was paid off in November 1795 and broken in Deptford in January 1796.

Notes

References

 Robert Gardiner, The First Frigates, Conway Maritime Press, London 1992. .
 David Lyon, The Sailing Navy List, Conway Maritime Press, London 1993. .
 Rif Winfield, British Warships in the Age of Sail, 1714 to 1792, Seaforth Publishing, London 2007. .

 

1773 ships
Sixth-rate frigates of the Royal Navy
Ships built on the Beaulieu River